Daniel Nion (born 20 July 1951) is a French equestrian. He competed in two events at the 1984 Summer Olympics.

References

External links
 
 

1951 births
Living people
French male equestrians
Olympic equestrians of France
Equestrians at the 1984 Summer Olympics
Place of birth missing (living people)
20th-century French people